WLZZ (104.5 FM, "Z104") is a radio station  broadcasting a country format. Licensed to Montpelier, Ohio, United States, the station is currently owned by Swick Broadcasting Company .

History
The station went on the air as WYDF on 1991-02-01. On 1991-04-15, the station changed its call sign to the current WLZZ.

On December 28, 2018, WLZZ changed their format from country to classic rock, branded as "Z104".

In August 2019, WLZZ changed their format from classic rock back to country, branded as "Superstar Country Z-104".

Previous logo

References

External links

LZZ
Radio stations established in 1991